Mark Andrew Sanders is a British designer and engineer. He is the designer of the Strida triangular folding bicycle, as well as the No-Spill Chopping Board, held in the permanent collection of the Museum of Modern Art.

Biography 
Sanders graduated from the Industrial Design Engineering (IDE) course at the Royal College of Art/Imperial College. During his time at RCA, Sanders designed the Strida folding bicycle. The Strida, noted for its simplicity, is featured in the book Fifty Bicycles that Changed the World by Alex Newson.

Sanders is the principal of MAS Design, a product design and engineering consultancy established in 1984.

Awards 
In 2009, Sanders was named Design Engineer of the Year at the inaugural British Engineering Excellence Awards.

Select list of inventions and designs 
 1983: Medicine dispenser with automatic dose indicator
 1985: Strida triangular folding bicycle
 1988: No-Spill Chopping Board, part of the permanent collection of the Museum of Modern Art
 2004: iF Mode, with Pacific Cycles, Gold ‘iF Award’ winner, 2013 Red Dot/Taipei Cycle D&I Award winner
 2006: One Touch Can Opener, 2007 International Design Excellence Awards gold award winner
 2008: One Touch Jar Opener (later called ‘Robotwist™’), Excellence in Design Awards gold award winner, China's Most Successful Designs Award top 25
 2012: Mando Footloose, Hybrid Folding Electric Bicycle (Design), 2012 Red Dot 'Best of the Best' Design Award winner
 2015: Mando Footloose IM, Hybrid Electric Bicycle (Design), Red Dot Design Award 2015 winner

References

External links 
Mark Sanders' Website

British industrial designers
British industrial engineers
British inventors
Year of birth missing (living people)
Living people
Sustainable transport pioneers